The Lunalilo Party was a political party in Hawaii, formed to support William Charles Lunalilo in the Royal Election of 1873 in which he won against David Kalākaua. He was known as being liberal, pro-democracy, and pro-American.

References
Hawaii and its people by Arthur Grove Day
Hawaiian Kingdom 1874-1893, the Kalakaua Dynastism by Ralph S. Kuykendall

Politics of Hawaii
Political parties in Hawaii
1873 establishments in Hawaii
Political parties established in 1873